A sabra or tzabar (plural: tzabarim) is an informal-turned-formal modern Hebrew term that defines any Jew born in Israel. The term came into widespread use in the 1930s to refer to a Jew who had been born in Palestine (including the British Mandate of Palestine and Ottoman Palestine; cf. New Yishuv & Old Yishuv), though it may have appeared earlier. Since the establishment of the State of Israel in 1948, Israelis have used the word to refer to a Jew born anywhere in the Land of Israel.

The term alludes to a tenacious, thorny desert plant, known in English as prickly pear, with a thick skin that conceals a sweet, softer interior. The cactus is compared to Israeli Jews, who are supposedly tough on the outside, but delicate and sweet on the inside.

In 2010, over 4,000,000 Israeli Jews (70%) were sabras, with an even greater percentage of Israeli Jewish youths falling into this category. In 2015, about 75% of Israel's Jewish population was native-born. In 2020, this had further increased to 78%.

History

The term came into widespread use within the Yishuv, or Jewish population of Palestine, in the 1930s, but it is thought to have been used as far back as the early 20th century, when it was used to refer to the first generation of native-born (Hebrew speaking) Jews produced by the Zionist movement, the children of the immigrants of the First Aliyah that began in 1881 in Romania. This generation of natives referred to themselves as "etrogim." The term "Tzabar" may have been used by immigrants of the Second Aliyah and the Third Aliyah, originally as an insulting term. The changing of the meaning of the term, to emphasize the softer interior rather than the roughness, was done by the journalist Uri Kesari, who himself was a sabra. Kesari published an essay, "We Are the Leaves of the Sabra!", on 18 April 1931 in the newspaper Doar HaYom in which he argued against the discrimination which was cast against the native-born by the new immigrants. The 1931 census of Palestine found that of a recorded Jewish population of 174,610, 73,195 people (42%) were born in Palestine.

According to Israeli sociologist Oz Almog, who studied the sociological development of the term, the first glimmers of a new culture appeared around the time of World War I when the children of First Aliyah immigrants were already displaying traditional sabra characteristics. Avshalom Feinberg has been referred to as "the first sabra." In the 1920s this new Hebrew culture was visibly emerging. The term was in widespread use in the 1930s and 1940s, and it increasingly became a term of prestige as the sabra turned into a cultural hero. At this time, there was now a large number of native-born Jews in the kibbutzim and moshavim and in urban areas, and as a result, sabra culture blossomed. Almog wrote that "as the Sabra archetype and stereotype took shape, the students at the Hebrew gymnasiums, the young people of the kibbutzim and moshavim, and the members of the youth movements and Palmach began developing a consciousness about their cultural uniqueness. They also produced and honed native status symbols and a peculiarly native Israeli style in language, dress, and collective leisure culture". He also claimed that the idea that a new Hebrew nation had arisen was widespread among Tel Aviv youth in the early 1940s.

In November 1948, with the 1948 Arab-Israeli War in its closing stages, Arthur Koestler published an article titled "Israel: the native generation" in which he profiled sabras as compared to Jewish immigrants from Europe and Arab and Muslim nations, who he described as a "lost generation", writing that "In their ensemble these form the lost generation of Israel, a transitory and amorphous mass which as yet lacks the character of a nation. Only in the native youth, born and reared in the country, does the first intimation of the future profile of Israel as a nation begin to outline itself." He claimed that "In his mental make-up the average young sabra is fearless to the point of recklessness, bold, extroverted, and little inclined towards, if not openly contemptuous of, intellectual pursuits" and that "The sabra's outlook on the world is rather provincial and hyper-chauvinistic. This could hardly be otherwise in a small and exposed pioneer community which had to defend its physical existence and build its State against almost impossible odds. One cannot create a nation without nationalism." That same month, Israel carried out its first census following independence. The census found that out of a Jewish population of 716,700, approximately 35% were native-born.

An important influence on the Sabra personality was considered the participation in national youth movements, (such as the Hanoar Haoved Vehalomed, Hashomer Hatzair and Hatsofim) followed by the universal participation in military service for both sexes. The term was used by the Zionist movement, to celebrate the "New Jew" that emerged in the Holy Land. Unlike the bourgeois "Old Jew" born in the diaspora, the "New Jew" was a kibbutz member or a farmer. The "Old Jew" often spoke broken Hebrew with a heavy accent, while the sabra spoke the language as a mother tongue. Unlike the "Old Jew" who did not fight for his self-defense, the Sabra fought in the Jewish resistance movements, in the Palmach and, after the establishment of Israel, in the Israel Defense Forces. The prestige of the Sabra increased during the 1948 Arab–Israeli War. The Israeli public, and especially the older generation, tended to attribute the achievements of the war to the country's "sabras", while minimizing the part of the new immigrants and other groups. Even descriptions of the achievements of Operation Kadesh (1956) emphasized the image of the Sabra.

The large immigration to Israel of Jews from Muslim countries during the 1950s, the penetration of Western culture and primarily American culture, as well as the social and political changes which were created following the Six-Day War and Yom Kippur War, resulted in a decline of the use of the term after the 1970s. Those who were born in the country after independence in 1948 became known as the "Dor haMedina", or "Statehood Generation", and have been largely described by cultural commentators as being motivated less by the strident nationalism and/or socialism of the pre-independence generations and more by a general cultural pragmatism and sensitivity to the mass-cultural output of Western powers.

With the establishment of the State of Israel in May 1948, large-scale Jewish immigration ensued from Europe, the Middle East, and North Africa, greatly increasing the Jewish population. As a result, the amount of native-born Jews as a percentage of the population went down from 35% in 1948 to 25% in 1951. However, as the immigration wave tapered off, the percentage of the native-born Jewish population gradually increased as more children were born, many to immigrants who arrived after independence. The percentage of the Jewish population that was native-born reached 33% in 1956, 38% in 1961, and 40% in 1965.

In culture 

The Sabra received an artistic and symbolic representation in the form of the illustrated character "Srulik" (which wears shorts, sandals and a Tembel hat), created by cartoonist Dosh. Another such character is the Israeli children's television character Kishkashta, a talking anthropomorphic cactus; the plant is another symbol of the Sabra.

The English form of the word, Sabra, served Israeli manufacturers who wanted to brand their products as recognisably Israeli products, which are sold in the foreign markets. As a result, "Sabra liqueur" and "Sabra sport" (the sports model of the "Sussita") were created. The world's largest hummus manufacturer (as of 2009) is a U.S. company called the Sabra Dipping Company.

In popular culture, an episode of the American Saturday Night Live series contained a sketch entitled "Sabra Price Is Right" featuring Tom Hanks as the guest host. The sketch was written by Robert Smigel and is a parody of Israel-born Jews making bargains with people who believe this show is The Price Is Right. In the sketch, Hanks's character "Uri Shurinson" and the other Sabra are swindling the contestants, conning them into purchasing shoddy products (a Summit clock-radio, a "Pinnacle satellite dish" that's a v-aerial, a cordless phone that's a defective rotary phone, a microwave that's a toaster oven, a CD-player that's a child's bank, and a defective buzzer from the game show itself) for which they guess the price rather than winning them. The sketch concludes with an Arab portrayed by Dana Carvey who bargains in the same manner as the Sabra and in the middle of their argument, they all "disco" as the sketch concludes. A sketch featured in an earlier SNL episode was entitled "Sabra Shopping Network" and also featured Uri (Tom Hanks) and his crew, this time bargaining with callers phoning into a television shopping show.

The American comedy film You Don't Mess with the Zohan (2008) plays heavily on sabra stereotypes.

"Marvel Comics" created a superhero named Sabra (Ruth Bat-Seraph's alter ego) in the 1980s, whose name is based on the Israeli Sabra. In September 2022, it was announced that the Israeli actress Shira Haas will play this character in the film "Captain America: New World Order" (part of the Marvel Cinematic Universe) which is to be released on May 3, 2024.

In politics 
The first sabra to exercise the powers of the office of the Prime Minister of Israel was Yigal Allon, who served as acting prime minister from February to March 1969; he was born in Kfar Tavor. The first sabra to serve as Prime Minister rather than acting Prime Minister was Yitzhak Rabin, who first held the office 1974–77, and then again 1992–1995. Since Rabin first took office, there have been four other sabra Prime Ministers: the current Prime Minister Benjamin Netanyahu is the first sabra Prime Minister to have been born in the modern state after Israel's declaration of independence in 1948; he first took office in 1996, before leaving office in 1999 and returning in 2009. Furthermore, Ehud Barak, Ariel Sharon, and Ehud Olmert were all born in what is now the territory of the State of Israel during the Mandate period. 

The first sabra who became President of Israel was Yitzhak Navon, who was born in Jerusalem. The first sabra born after Israel's declaration of independence, who exercised the powers of the office of the President of Israel, was Dalia Itzik. The first sabra born after Israel's declaration of independence, who became President of Israel rather than acting President, is the incumbent Isaac Herzog. He is also the first son of a former Israeli president to also become President.

Statehood Generation leaders
In addition to Netanyahu being the first of the Statehood Generation to serve as Prime Minister, Avraham Burg, speaker of the Knesset from 1999–2003, was also the first Speaker to have been born in the modern state since 1948. The first of the Statehood Generation to serve as acting President, was Dalia Itzik and to serve as the actual President is Isaac Herzog. Naftali Bennett and Yair Lapid, former Prime Ministers, were also born in the modern state.

See also 
 Sabra (comics)
 Culture of Israel
 Israeli Jews
 Kibbutz
 Moshav
 Muscular Judaism
 Negation of the Diaspora
 Srulik

References

External links

Hebrew site with video of Kishkashta

Hebrew slang
Israeli culture
 
Society of Israel
Jewish ethnic groups
1930s neologisms